This is a list of members of the sixth parliament of the South Australian House of Assembly, which sat from 27 May 1870 until 23 November 1871. The members were elected at the 1870 colonial election.

 West Torrens MHA Henry Strangways resigned on 28 July 1871. James Boucaut won the resulting by-election on 10 August.
 Light MHA Edward Hamilton resigned on 28 July 1871. James White won the resulting by-election on 12 August.
 Victoria MHA William Paltridge resigned on 28 July 1871. Neville Blyth won the resulting by-election on 24 August.

References
Statistical Record of the Legislature 1836-2007, Parliament of SA, www.parliament.sa.gov.au

Members of South Australian parliaments by term
19th-century Australian politicians